The Schokari sand racer (Psammophis schokari) is a species of psammophiid snake found in parts of Asia and Africa. Psammophis schokari aegyptius has been elevated to species status. Many people refer to snakes in the genus Psammophis as colubrids, but this is now known to be incorrect—they were once classified in the Colubridae, but our more sophisticated understanding of the relationships among the groups of snakes has led herpetologists to reclassify Psammophis and its relatives into Lamprophiidae, a family more closely related to Elapidae than to Colubridae.

Distribution
Northwest India, Afghanistan (Leviton 1959: 461), Pakistan, south Turkmenistan, Western Sahara, Tunisia, Morocco, Algeria, Libya, Egypt, Jordan, Palestine, Israel, Mali, Mauritania, Nigeria, Sudan, Ethiopia, Eritrea, Somalia, Saudi Arabia, United Arab Emirates, Oman, Syria, Iraq, Iran (Kavir Desert), and Yemen.

Type locality: Yemen.

References

 Forskål, P. 1775 Descriptiones animalium, avium, amphibiorum, piscium, insectorum, vermium; quae in itinere Orientali observavit Petrus Forskål. Mölleri, Hauniae, xxxiv + 164 pp.
 Marx, H. 1988 The colubrid snake, Psammophis schokari, from the Arabian Peninsula. Fieldiana Zool. New Ser. 40 (1383): 1-16

External links
 
 http://itgmv1.fzk.de/www/itg/uetz/herp/photos/Psammophis_schokari.jpg 
 http://www.podarcis.nl/downloads/2001/2/eng/OmanDeel422001Eng.pdf

Psammophis
Reptiles of Pakistan
Reptiles of Afghanistan
Reptiles of Central Asia
Fauna of Egypt
Fauna of Libya
Reptiles of North Africa
Fauna of the Middle East
Reptiles described in 1775
Snakes of Jordan